The 14th Guldbagge Awards ceremony, presented by the Swedish Film Institute, honored the best Swedish films of 1977 and 1978, and took place on 18 September 1978. The Adventures of Picasso directed by Tage Danielsson was presented with the award for Best Film.

Awards
 Best Film: The Adventures of Picasso by Tage Danielsson
 Best Director: Olle Hellbom for The Brothers Lionheart
 Best Actor: Anders Lönnbro for The Score
 Best Actress: Lil Terselius for Games of Love and Loneliness
 Special Achievement: Eric M. Nilsson
 The Ingmar Bergman Award: Wic Kjellin

References

External links
Official website
Guldbaggen on Facebook
Guldbaggen on Twitter
14th Guldbagge Awards at Internet Movie Database

1978 in Sweden
1978 film awards
Guldbagge Awards ceremonies
September 1978 events in Europe
1970s in Stockholm